Star Men is a 2015 documentary film directed by Alison E. Rose that follows four British astronomers—Donald Lynden-Bell, Roger Griffin, Neville Woolf and Wallace Sargent—as they retrace a road trip across the American South West.

External links 
 
 
 Guardian review 19 Nov 2015

Documentary films about science
Documentary films about the United States
2010s road movies
2010s British films